Iowa Falls Community School District is a rural public school district headquartered in Iowa Falls, Iowa. The district occupies sections of Hardin and Franklin counties.

In 2006, parents in the northern portion of the Hubbard–Radcliffe Community School District preferred the idea of that district grade-sharing with Iowa Falls instead of the Eldora–New Providence Community School District.

From the 2014–15 school year until the 2017–18 school year, the district had entered into a grade-sharing agreement with the Alden Community School District in which students of particular grade levels attend schools in another districts' schools. Initially it was a two-way sharing agreement, or one in that both districts sent students to each other's schools. Alden hosted the 6th grade for both districts. By 2017 there was a proposal to modify it so only Alden sends students to Iowa Falls, and not the other way around, for a period until the 2027–28 school year. That way 6th-graders at Iowa Falls and Alden would go to their respective schools. All five members of the Iowa Falls CSD board approved this on May 9, 2016. The Iowa Falls CSD board, in 2016, had asked Alden to merge.

The school mascot is the Cadets. Their colors are black, gold, and red.

Schools
The district operates:
 Iowa Falls-Alden High School
 Riverbend Middle School
 Rock Run Elementary School - grades 2–5
 Pineview Elementary School - grades PK–1

Iowa Falls-Alden High School

Athletics 
The Cadets compete in the North Central Conference in the following sports:

Cross country 
Volleyball 
 1999 Class 2A state champions
Football
 1996 Class 2A state champions 
Basketball
 Boys' 2-time Class 2A state champions (1998, 1999)
Wrestling
Track and field
 Boys' 4-time state champions (1974, 1978, 1979, 1995)
Golf 
 Boys' 1963 Class B state champions
Tennis
Soccer
Baseball
 1998 Class 2A state champions 
Softball

See also
List of school districts in Iowa
List of high schools in Iowa

References

External links
 Iowa Falls and Alden Community School Districts - Joint website of the Iowa Falls district and the Alden Community School District
 

School districts in Iowa
Education in Franklin County, Iowa
Education in Hardin County, Iowa